Jhené Aiko Efuru Chilombo (born March 16, 1988) is an American singer and songwriter. She is known for her ethereal vocal style and evocative lyricism. Aiko embarked on her music career contributing vocals and appearing in music videos for R&B group B2K. In an effort to promote and cultivate a following for her, she was marketed as B2K member Lil' Fizz's cousin; she is not actually related to him. In 2003, Aiko was set to release her debut album, My Name Is Jhené, through her labels Sony, The Ultimate Group and Epic; however, the album was never released, and Aiko asked to be released from the label in order to continue her education.

In March 2011, Aiko made her return to music with the release of her first full-length project, a mixtape titled Sailing Soul(s). On December 16, 2011, Aiko signed a recording contract with American record producer No I.D.'s record label ARTium, under the aegis of Def Jam Recordings. In 2013, Aiko appeared on Big Sean's single "Beware" alongside Lil Wayne, which became her first top 40 single on the US Billboard Hot 100 chart. In November 2013, she released her first project for Artium and Def Jam, an extended play (EP), titled Sail Out. The EP was supported by the singles "3:16AM", "Bed Peace" (featuring Childish Gambino) and "The Worst", the latter of which went on to become certified platinum by the Recording Industry Association of America (RIAA).

Aiko released her major-label debut album, Souled Out, on September 9, 2014. On September 22, 2017, she released her second studio album Trip. On March 6, 2020, she released her third studio album, Chilombo, which earned Aiko three Grammy Award nominations, including Album of the Year.

Early life
Jhené Aiko Efuru Chilombo was born on March 16, 1988, in Los Angeles, California. Her family lived in South Los Angeles, but their home burned down when she was seven so they moved near Slauson Avenue around View Park–Windsor Hills, Baldwin Hills, and Ladera Heights where she was homeschooled until high school. She calls her home neighborhood "Slauson Hills". Aiko is the daughter of Christina Yamamoto and pediatrician Karamo Chilombo (born Gregory Wycliff Barnes). Her parents are divorced. Aiko has seven siblings, four from both her mother and father's side and three half siblings from her father's side. Her sister is R&B singer Mila J. Her mother is of Spanish, Dominican, and Japanese descent, and her father is of Native American, African-American, and German-Jewish descent. Her maternal grandfather is Japanese and her maternal grandmother is Creole Dominican with Spanish ancestry. She took vocal lessons in Culver City, but quit when she unexpectedly became pregnant.

Musical career

2002–2006: Career beginnings and hiatus
Aiko embarked on her musical career contributing vocals to several B2K releases, as well as a song on The Master of Disguise soundtrack in 2002, while signed to The Ultimate Group and managed by Chris Stokes. During this time she was known as the cousin of B2K's rapper, Lil' Fizz, though she is not actually related to him. It was used as a marketing tool, suggested by her labels Sony, The Ultimate Group and Epic Records, to promote Aiko through B2K and attract an audience; nonetheless Aiko affirms that she and Lil' Fizz grew up together and were close like family. She featured on tracks five through eight of the R&B group's remix album B2K: The Remixes – Volume 1. "Santa Baby", a cover she recorded, was also featured on their album Santa Hooked Me Up and she appeared as a guest vocalist on the song "Tease" from Pandemonium!. Her song "Dog" appeared as a bonus track.

Aiko also appeared in numerous music videos including O'Ryan's debut video, "Take It Slow", B2K's debut video "Uh Huh" and "Why I Love You", P.Y.T.'s "Same Ol' Same Ol' (Remix)" featuring Sarai, Play's "M.A.S.T.E.R. (Part 2)" featuring Lil' Fizz video and Morgan Smith's 2004 video "Blow Ya Whistle". Aiko also has songs featured on the soundtracks of Barbershop, The Master of Disguise, You Got Served, The Proud Family and Byou. She released a video for her single "NO L.O.V.E" (re-recorded from Tha' Rayne version in 2002), which debuted on BET's 106 & Park when she was 15 years old. Aiko was set to release her debut album, then-titled My Name Is Jhené in 2003 through Sony, The Ultimate Group, Epic; however, the album was never released due to tension at the record label Epic, which ultimately led to Aiko asking to be released from the label. Aiko later left the aforementioned labels in order to continue her education.

2007–2011: Return to music and Sail Out 

In 2007, she made a return to music, in an interview she spoke on the choice saying "Shortly before I conceived my daughter, I stepped back into the field and took a meeting with a label head. In this meeting, I was innocently told, to 'sell' myself when walking into these meetings. "That's when I decided I would 'sail' myself rather than sell myself."
Aiko released a mixtape on March 16, 2011, titled Sailing Soul(s) via her official website, JheneAiko.com. All the songs on the mixtape were written by her, except "July". The mixtape featured collaborations from Miguel, Drake and Kanye West as well as others. To promote the mixtape Aiko was joined by R&B singer Miguel on a one off free secret performance on Sunday, July 15. On October 21, 2012, Aiko released a music video for the song "My Mine". Aiko also released a video for the mixtape's second track, "Stranger". In 2011, she also began working closely with artists from Carson-based independent record label Top Dawg Entertainment such as Schoolboy Q and Ab-Soul, the latter was featured on her EP released November 12, 2013, titled Sail Out.

2012–2014: Breakthrough and Souled Out

In 2012, Aiko met with No I.D., record producer and vice president of A&R at Def Jam, who ended up signing Aiko to his Artium Records imprint through Def Jam. Aiko released the track "3:16AM", which was made available for digital download on iTunes September 4, 2012. The song was released as the first single from Sail Out. In 2012, Aiko was also the opening act on the highly anticipated "Life Is Good/Black Rage" concert tour headlined by fellow American artists, rapper Nas and singer-songwriter Lauryn Hill. In June 2013, Aiko was featured on the Big Sean song "Beware", which became her first song to chart on the US Billboard Hot 100. In October 2013, it was revealed Aiko would open for Canadian rapper Drake on his Would You like a Tour? concert tour.

Aiko then released her debut EP Sail Out, on November 12, 2013. The EP debuted at number eight on the US Billboard 200 chart, with first-week sales of 34,000 copies. On January 14, 2014, "The Worst" was serviced to rhythmic contemporary radio in the United States as the album's third single. On May 2, 2014 "The Worst" rose from three to one on the airplay Mainstream R&B/Hip-Hop, in doing so she became the first female artist to top the chart as a lead with a debut single since Jazmine Sullivan in 2008. The song peaked on the US Billboard Hot 100 at forty-three, becoming Aiko's first solo release to chart in the region, the song also peaked at number eleven on the US Hot R&B/Hip-Hop Songs

On January 18, 2014, Aiko appeared on Saturday Night Live performing the song "From Time", with the episode's guest host, Drake. In a January 2014 interview with Vibe, Aiko announced her debut studio album Souled Out would be released in May 2014. However, the album would be delayed. On March 16, 2014, Aiko premiered a song titled "My Afternoon Dream," produced by Key Wane, along with an accompanying music video directed by Aiko and Krissy. On June 23, 2014, "To Love & Die", was released for digital download as the album's lead single. Following its release "To Love & Die" debuted and peaked at number forty-six on the US Billboard Hot R&B/Hip-Hop charts. On June 26, 2014, Canadian singer-songwriter The Weeknd, announced he would be headlining the "King of the Fall Tour", essentially a mini-tour across America in September / October 2014, the tour will consist of four shows and start on September 19, 2014, in New York, at the Barclays Center and end on October 10 in San Francisco, at the Bill Graham Civic Auditorium. Aiko and frequent collaborator ScHoolboy Q, were confirmed as the tour's supporting acts, respectively.

After three years of recording Aiko released her debut album Souled Out on September 8, 2014. An anticipated release, the album was released to commercial and critical success. The album debuted at number three on the US Billboard 200, selling 70,000 copies in its opening week, in doing so the album became that week's second highest debut and doubled the first week sales of Aiko's debut extended play Sail Out (2013). The album also debuted at number one on the US Top R&B/Hip-Hop Albums and US R&B Albums and has sold 121,012 units in the US. The album produced a further three singles: the album's second single, "The Pressure", was released on iTunes on July 18, 2014. The Pressure debuted at number twenty five on the US Hot R&B Songs chart, and peaked the following week, at number twenty three. "Wading" was released as the album's third single on December 12, 2014, along with an accompanying video, followed by the release of Spotless Mind Her debut album was included on numerous critics' year end lists and was described by Gail Mitchell of Billboard as one of the albums to breakthrough and "make some noise" in the R&B genre. Following the release of the song "Post to Be", a collaboration with Omarion, the line "I might let your boy chauffeur me, but he gotta eat the booty like groceries" was described as a standout lyric and "the lyric of the summer, or the lyric of the year," by Rob Markman, editor for MTV News.

2015–2018: Twenty88 and Trip

In February 2015, Aiko was nominated for three Grammy Awards at the 57th Annual Grammy Awards, including Best R&B Song for "The Worst" and Best Urban Contemporary Album for Sail Out. The same month it was announced that Aiko would join rapper J. Cole on his tour entitled, Forest Hills Drive Tour. On March 19, 2015, Aiko released the free song "Living Room Flow."
Aiko covered "In a World of My Own / Very Good Advice" from the Disney film Alice in Wonderland, the cover was included on the "We Love Disney" compilation album which was released in October 2015.

In March 2016, Aiko announced a collaboration album with rapper Big Sean, under the name Twenty88, their self-titled debut album was made available to stream exclusively on TIDAL for four days, and was made available for download on April 1. According to the duo, "TWENTY88 tells the story of the highs and lows of a relationship, with insights into conflict, memories, love, sex, and more and features production from Key Wane, Detail, and Tommy Brown." From late 2016 to mid-2017, Aiko released numerous non-album singles such as "Maniac", "First Fuck" with 6lack and "Hello Ego" featuring Chris Brown. The lead single to her second studio album, "While We're Young', was released in June 2016. Aiko's second album, Trip, was released without a prior announcement on September 22, 2017. The lead single, "While We're Young", was released on June 9, 2017, for streaming and digital download. A 23-minute autobiographical film titled after the album was also released a day before Trip on September 21, 2017, co-directed by Aiko. On September 27, 2017, American singer Lana Del Rey revealed that Aiko would be opening for her on select dates of her concert tour entitled the LA to the Moon Tour during January 2018. Aiko toured with Del Rey from January 5 to 13.

2019–present: Chilombo 

On May 8, 2019, Aiko released "Triggered (Freestyle)", which debuted at number fifty-one on the US Billboard Hot 100 and peaked at number 3 on the US R&B Songs. It is the first official single from her forthcoming 2019 album. The freestyle discussed various topics, including her past relationships. There were immediate rumors that the song might have been addressing Aiko's ex-boyfriend, Big Sean. However, Aiko went on Twitter to dispell the rumors about "Triggered (freestyle)" being a diss track.

Aiko's third studio album, Chilombo, was released in March 2020. On February 13, 2022, she performed America the Beautiful before Super Bowl LVI.

In July 2022, Aiko started the imprint Allel Sound in collaboration with Def Jam records. She signed rapper August 08 and features on the latter's single "Water Sign".

Personal life
Aiko was baptized when she was 16 at the evangelical Pentecostal Foursquare Church. She dated American R&B singer O'Ryan from 2005 to 2008. At the age of 20, Aiko gave birth to her daughter with O'Ryan on November 19, 2008. 

Before her brother Miyagi died of cancer on July 19, 2012, Aiko recorded "For My Brother" on her laptop, which was initially intended only for her brother to hear. He was able to listen to the song shortly before his death.
	
On August 27, 2013, Aiko was involved in a car accident in Los Angeles along with her daughter, older sister Miyoko, and her daughter's father, O'Ryan. She suffered various injuries, but the other passengers were unharmed.
On March 16, 2016, Aiko and Oladipo "Dot da Genius" Omishore revealed they were married. On August 9, 2016, Aiko filed for divorce citing irreconcilable differences. The divorce was finalized in October 2017.

Since 2016, Aiko has been in an on-again, off-again relationship with Big Sean. Their son was born on November 8, 2022.

Artistry

Voice and music
Aiko is a soprano. Rap-Up says that she possesses a "sensually sweet voice" while Jim Farber of the New York Daily News describes her voice as having a "feathery tone, sky-high pitch and dazed delivery" that floats "above the beat, sexy and aloof"; Farber has also said that Aiko is "the female answer" to Frank Ocean. Jordan Sargent of Pitchfork Media compared Aiko's vocals to those of R&B singers Cassie, Brandy, Ciara and, the late Aaliyah. Thematically Aiko's work contains direct and "acute" lyrics that can be sometimes "girlish." Adam Fleischer of MTV described Aiko's lyrical content as being "catchy and emotive", continuing to note Aiko's lyrics as having no boundaries; which mix "moments of sensitivity and love, but also moments of confusion and aggression."

Aiko's musical style is associated with a new wave of music called PBR&B, which is described as emerging, stylistic alternative to contemporary R&B. Besides PBR&B, Aiko explores a variety of genres including psychedelic music, classic R&B and hip hop music. Aiko has described herself as being part of this movement, she noted her own musical style as being "alternative" and a "new-generation R&B", which she compared herself to the style of Frank Ocean, Miguel and Drake. Described by Erin Lowers a reviewer from XXL magazine, Aiko's music is alternative R&B, which the reviewer described as being created with the use of heavily used synthesizers and "wooly drum loops", the reviewer continued to say that her genre is caught in a "revolutionized limbo." Bradley Stern of Time, compared the Aiko's musical style to the work of Sade, calling the album's genre "future R&B", Stern continued to compare her music to the work of The Weeknd, Tinashe and FKA twigs.

Aiko writes music every day, often writing lines or a poem, and begins to add them to melodies. She describes her writing style as "freestyle," where she just says how she is feeling, taking a day or up to a month to complete.  Aiko is noted for being an author to her first published book 2Fish(2017).This book contains a collection of poems, songs, and drawings she's created from the age of twelve up to the books publication date. Aiko reveals several lyrical verses in her book that can be found in her album Trip which was released the same year as the publication of 2Fish. During the recording of the album Aiko opted to freestyle when writing the album, she would have a beat or would sit with producers and she would sing a melody until she had words, she described the process as not having a lot written  down saying "there's not a lot of writing down—I'll only write it down to make sure it makes sense after I come up with it. For the most part, I like to not have second thoughts." Aiko revealed that whilst writing music she enjoys being high in order to use the feeling as inspiration and that for the entire writing and recording process of her debut mixtape Sailing Soul(s), she was under the influence of cannabis. When writing for her debut studio album, she did the same but recorded while sober. Aiko places great importance on writing her music, believing it defines her as an artist: "After each song I've lost like a piece of me, because I've put it in to (sic) the song." Singer Nick Jonas cited Aiko as an influence during the recording of his debut album, noting her alternative R&B sound as his influence.

Influences

Aiko cites American rapper Tupac as a major influence, saying he is "a big inspiration for me just to stick to who I am and to actually stand for something through music" and "an icon for speaking your mind and being you, even if it's controversial." Aiko also cites R&B singers Aaliyah and Ciara as well as rappers Eminem and Kendrick Lamar as influences. Aiko also calls recording artist Kid Cudi, a major influence, stating Cudi is "pretty much one of the only people that I listen to consistently. No matter what he puts out, I'm one of those fans. He can do no wrong in my eyes."

Aiko also credits Brandy as a major influence, saying, "I always say the person who taught me how to sing indirectly because I listened to her all the time was Brandy. I fell in love with her voice when I was six years old. I always loved Brandy." Aiko also listens to Beyoncé to learn from her vocal technique and is also influenced by India.Arie and Amel Larrieux. Aiko is influenced by John Mayer saying "He's probably one of my number one musical influences because of his writing ability and his voice."

During the recording of her debut extended play "Sail Out" (2013), Aiko stated she took a large amount of influence from hip-hop and rap music notably the genre's beats. Aiko has stated growing up in a musical family influenced her, noting her siblings bands as an influence, Aiko also cited R&B band TLC as an influence when growing up. During the 1990s, she began listening to Alanis Morissette, Fiona Apple, and Lil' Kim, stating her influences were a mixture, following this Aiko began listening to Sade Adu.

Discography

Studio albums
 Souled Out (2014)
 Trip (2017)
 Chilombo (2020)

Tours
Headlining
 Enter the Void Tour (2014)
 Trip (The Tour) (2017–2018)
 The Magic Hour Tour (2020)

Supporting
 J. Cole – Forest Hills Drive Tour (2014–2015)
 Drake – Would You Like a Tour? (2013–2014)
 The Weeknd – King of the Fall Tour (2014)
 Snoop Dogg and Wiz Khalifa – The High Road Summer Tour (2016)
 Lana Del Rey – LA to the Moon Tour (2018)
 Beyoncé and Jay-Z - On the Run II Tour (2018)

Awards and nominations
American Music Awards

!scope="col"| 
|-
| 2014
|rowspan="2"| Herself
|rowspan="2"| Favorite Female Artist- Soul/R&B
| 
|
|-
| 2020
| 
| 
|}

BET Awards

|-
|rowspan="3"|2014
|rowspan="2"|"The Worst"
|Centric Award
|
|-
|Coca-Cola Viewers' Choice Award
|
|-
|rowspan="3"|Herself
|rowspan="3"|Best Female R&B Artist
| 
|-
|2015 
| 
|-
|2020
| 

Grammy Awards

|-
| rowspan="3"| 2015
| "The Worst"
| Best R&B Song
| 
|-
| Sail Out
| Best Urban Contemporary Album
| 
|-
| "Blak Majik" (with Common)
| Best Rap/Sung Collaboration
| 
|-
| rowspan="3"| 2021
| rowspan="2"| Chilombo
| Album of the Year
| 
|-
| Best Progressive R&B Album
| 
|-
| "Lightning and Thunder" (with John Legend)
| Best R&B Performance
| 
|}

NAACP Image Awards

!scope="col"| 
|-
| rowspan="3"| 2021
| Chilombo
| Outstanding Album
| 
| rowspan="3"| 
|-
| rowspan="2"| "B.S." (feat. H.E.R.)
| Outstanding Duo, Group or Collaboration (Contemporary)
| 
|-
| Outstanding Soul/R&B Song
| 
|}

Soul Train Awards

|-
|rowspan="3"|2014
| rowspan="2"|"The Worst", Jhene Aiko (Jhene Aiko Chilombo, Mac Robinson, Brian Warfield)
|Video of The Year
|
|-
|The Ashford and Simpson Songwriter's Award
|
|-
| rowspan="2"|Herself
|Best New Artist
|
|-
|rowspan="2"|2020
| Best R&B/Soul Female Artist
| 
|-
| Chilombo
| Album of the Year
| 
|-

References

External links

 
 
 

 
1988 births
Living people
American child singers
Christians from California
Chilombo family
Singers from Los Angeles
African-American women singer-songwriters
American contemporary R&B singers
People from Ladera Heights, California
21st-century American women singers
21st-century American singers
American singers of Dominican Republic descent
American people of German-Jewish descent
American people of Spanish descent
American people who self-identify as being of Native American descent
African-American songwriters
Singer-songwriters from California
Cocaine 80s members
American musicians of Japanese descent